
Gmina Kije is a rural gmina (administrative district) in Pińczów County, Świętokrzyskie Voivodeship, in south-central Poland.

The gmina contains parts of the protected areas called Nida Landscape Park and Szaniec Landscape Park.

Villages
Gmina Kije contains the villages and settlements of Borczyn, Czechów, Gartatowice, Gołuchów, Górki, Hajdaszek, Janów, Kije, Kliszów, Kokot, Lipnik, Rębów, Samostrzałów, Stawiany, Umianowice, Wierzbica, Włoszczowice, Wola Żydowska, Wymysłów and Żydówek.

Neighbouring gminas
Gmina Kije is bordered by the gminas of Chmielnik, Imielno, Morawica, Pińczów and Sobków.

References
Polish official population figures 2006

Kije
Pińczów County